The 1926–27 season was the thirty-second season in which Dundee competed at a Scottish national level, playing in Division One, where they would finish in 5th place. Dundee would also compete in the Scottish Cup, where they would make it to the 3rd round before being knocked out by Celtic. The club would return to its regular navy blue jersey this season.

Scottish Division One 

Statistics provided by Dee Archive.

League table

Scottish Cup 

Statistics provided by Dee Archive.

Player Statistics 
Statistics provided by Dee Archive

|}

See also 

 List of Dundee F.C. seasons

References

External links 

 1926-27 Dundee season on Fitbastats

Dundee F.C. seasons
Dundee